Saiju Titus (born 6 October 1981) is an Indian cricketer. He made his List A debut for Puducherry in the 2018–19 Vijay Hazare Trophy on 21 September 2018. He made his first-class debut for Puducherry in the 2018–19 Ranji Trophy on 22 December 2018.

References

External links
 

1981 births
Living people
Indian cricketers
Pondicherry cricketers
Place of birth missing (living people)